Miroslav Kosev (born 9 July 1974) is a former Bulgarian footballer who currently works as a manager.

Career

Kosev spent his whole career in Bulgarian football, playing for the two main Burgas-based teams. Following his retirement, he turned to coaching.

References

1974 births
Living people
Sportspeople from Burgas
Bulgarian footballers
Association football midfielders
FC Chernomorets Burgas players
Neftochimic Burgas players
First Professional Football League (Bulgaria) players